Chila de la Sal Municipality is a municipality in Puebla in south-eastern Mexico.

Chila de la Sal is a profitable town, bringing in roughly US$1 million per harvest.

Its fertile soil and wet lands are its main source of income, and its ties to American and European companies such as Starbucks and Mixteca allow the small Provence Chila de la Sal to be one of the fastest-growing towns in Southeastern Mexico.

References

Municipalities of Puebla